Harris Brown McDowell Jr. (February 10, 1906 – November 24, 1988) was an American farmer and politician from Middletown in New Castle County, Delaware. He was a member of the Democratic Party, who served in the Delaware General Assembly and five terms as U.S. Representative from Delaware.

Early life and family
McDowell was born near Middletown, Delaware. He attended the public schools of Middletown, and graduated from Beacom Business College in Wilmington. He lived in Middletown, was engaged in farming, also in the insurance and real estate business, and was a member of the State Board of Agriculture from 1937 until 1940.

Political career
McDowell served in the State House during the 1941/42 session and then in the State Senate for the 1943/44 and 1945/46 sessions. During those years he was a director of Interstate Milk Producers Cooperative and member of Delaware Farm Bureau from 1941 until 1948. He served as Secretary of State for Delaware during Governor Elbert N. Carvel's first term, from 1949 until 1953 and was a member of New Castle County Zoning Commission in 1953 and 1954.

McDowell was elected to the U.S. Representatives in 1954, defeating Republican Lillian I. Martin. During this term, he served with the Democratic majority in the 84th Congress. He lost his bid for a second term in 1956 to Republican Harry G. Haskell Jr. McDowell then was elected again to the U.S. Representatives in 1958, defeating incumbent Republican U.S. Representative Harry G. Haskell Jr., and won election three more times, also defeating Republicans James T. McKinstry in 1960, Wilmer F. Williams in 1962, and James H. Snowden in 1964. During these terms, he served with the Democratic majority in the 86th, 87th, 88th, and 89th Congress. Finally, he lost his bid for a sixth term in 1966 to William V. Roth Jr., then a Wilmington lawyer. His support of President Lyndon Johnson's war policies may have contributed to his defeat. In all, he served twice, once from January 3, 1955 until January 3, 1957, and again from January 3, 1959 until January 3, 1967, during the administrations of U.S. Presidents Dwight D. Eisenhower, John F. Kennedy, and Lyndon B. Johnson.

McDowell did not sign the 1956 Southern Manifesto, and voted in favor of the Civil Rights Acts of 1960 and 1964, and the Voting Rights Act of 1965.

Death and legacy
McDowell died in Middletown, Delaware on November 24, 1988, Thanksgiving Day, after a stroke a month prior. He is buried in the Forest Presbyterian Cemetery there. His son, Harris McDowell III, was a member of the Delaware Senate from 1977 to 2021.

Almanac
Elections are held the first Tuesday after November 1. Members of the General Assembly take office the second Tuesday of January. State Senators have a four-year term and State Representatives have a two-year term. U.S. Representatives take office January 3 and have a two-year term.

References

External links
Biographical Directory of the United States Congress
Delaware’s Members of Congress
Harris Brown McDowell Jr. entry at The Political Graveyard

1906 births
1988 deaths
People from Middletown, Delaware
Democratic Party members of the Delaware House of Representatives
Democratic Party members of the United States House of Representatives from Delaware
Democratic Party Delaware state senators
Secretaries of State of Delaware
Burials in New Castle County, Delaware
Goldey–Beacom College alumni
20th-century American politicians